The Software Devloveper, stylized as The Software DevLOVEper, is an Indian Telugu-language romantic comedy drama web series written and directed by K. Subbu. Created by Infinitum Media, the series has an ensemble cast of Shanmukh Jaswanth Kandregula, Vaishnavi Chaitanya, Pruthvi Mukka, Jhakaas Pruthvi and Iduri Sri Priya. The ten-episode series premiered on YouTube on 31 July 2020.

Synopsis 
A group of four people including Shannu work in a social software company when a new girl, Vaishnavi, joins their team. Shannu falls in love with Vaishnavi and tries to spend time with her, but she treats him like a friend. Later, she thought that Mr. Shannu loves her, but when she cross checked if Shannu loves her or not, he lies that he is treating her as a friend. When he realized that she cross checked and she loves  him too. He messages her that he loves her. But she hadn't seen the message, her father saw this message and took away her phone. Later Vaishnavi marries another guy. At the end, she realises that he always loved her. At the end of Season 1, it is shown that Shannu goes abroad for onsite.

Cast 

 Shanmukh Jaswanth Kandregula as Shanmukh "Shannu"/ "Mr. Shannu" Jaswanth
 Vaishnavi Chaitanya as Vaishnavi
 Pruthvi Mukka as DC Don
 Nagarapu Pruthvi as Marvel Manohar
 Iduri Sri Priya as Harika
 Palaparthi Sri Vidya as HR Manager Shruti
 Jaya Chandra as Manager Aravind
Subbu K as Advisor
Pravallika Damerla as Priya, Vaishnavi's replacement (Only appears in Episode 10)

Production 
In an interview to Sakshi, director Subbu said that he didn't have a plan of making the first season. He rather wrote a story that needs a basic plot. He then confirmed that the story he initially wrote will be made as the second season.

Episodes

Season 1 (2020)

Reception 
Upon release, the first season was an instant hit garnering more than 158 million (15.8 crore) views combined. Karthik Keramulu of Film Companion quoted it as the "Baahubali of Telugu YouTube" but criticized the performance of Shanmukh and stated "Plus, the main problem with Shanmukh, as an actor, is that he’s not convincing enough. To put it mildly, he needs acting classes.".

References

External links 

 

2020 web series debuts
Telugu-language web series
Indian drama web series
Indian comedy web series
2020s fads and trends
Viral videos
2020s YouTube series
2020 YouTube videos